Vackor az első bében (English: Vackor in Grade 1B) is a Hungarian children's animated TV series from 1985. It was produced at Pannónia Filmstúdió.

List of episodes 
 Egy piszén pisze kölyökmackó vigasságos napjairól
 Első nap az első bében
 Vackor elbeszéli szüleinek, hogy milyen az az első bé!
 Vackor Csirió mókuskáról mesél a gyerekeknek
 Zachár Zsófi megsúgja Vackornak, hogy van egy piros mackója
 Vackor a táblánál, de csak tolmáccsal akar felelni
 Vackor véletlen találkozása Vas Pistával és Kovács Vicuval 
 Maros Dorka elpanaszolja Vackornak, hogy az ő neve tulajdonképpen Szilvia
 Vackor iskolát kerül, de rettenetesen megbánja
 Marci bácsi arra tanítja Vackort, hogy az életet komolyan vegye
 Vackor lovagi szolgálata Zachár Zsófi védelmében

Mokép published the series on a DVD, and later on MTVA in 2013 issued the digitally renewed version.

External links 
 

1985 Hungarian television series debuts
Hungarian animated television series
Hungarian children's television series
1980s Hungarian television series
Hungarian-language television shows
1985 Hungarian television series endings